Wes Carroll (born January 5, 1979) is an American college baseball coach, currently serving as head coach of the Evansville Purple Aces baseball team.  He has held that position since the 2009 season.  He played at Evansville, becoming the Purple Aces' first ever Freshman All-American.  He then went on to a minor league career, reaching Triple-A and playing in spring training games with his brother Jamey Carroll.  He then became an assistant coach with the Purple Aces for three seasons before ascending to the top job.

Head coaching record

Below is a table of Carroll's yearly records as a collegiate head baseball coach.

See also
List of current NCAA Division I baseball coaches

https://gopurpleaces.com/sports/baseball/schedule/2022

References

External links

1979 births
Living people
Baseball coaches from Indiana
Baseball players from Indiana
Baseball infielders
Batavia Muckdogs players
Brevard County Manatees players
Clearwater Phillies players
Edmonton Trappers players
Evansville Purple Aces baseball coaches
Evansville Purple Aces baseball players
Harrisburg Senators players
Lakewood BlueClaws players
New Orleans Zephyrs players
Sportspeople from Evansville, Indiana